Pete Graham Woodworth (born July 29, 1988) is an American professional baseball coach. He is the pitching coach for the Seattle Mariners of Major League Baseball (MLB).

Career
Woodworth attended St. Petersburg Catholic High School in St. Petersburg, Florida. Woodworth attended the University of South Florida for one year, before transferring to Florida Gulf Coast University. He played four years of college baseball for FGC and graduated with a bachelor's degree in History.

Woodworth went undrafted in the 2010 MLB draft, and signed a free agent contract with the Tampa Bay Rays. He spent his only professional season playing for the GCL Rays in 2010. Woodworth returned to Florida Gulf Coast as a volunteer assistant coach for the team from August 2011 until February 2012. He then rejoined the Tampa Bay organization as an area scout. He then served as the pitching coach for Nova Southeastern University in 2014. Woodworth returned to Florida Gulf Coast and served as their pitching coach in 2015 and 2016.

Woodworth was hired by the Seattle Mariners organization on June 22, 2016, to be the pitching coach for the Clinton LumberKings for the remainder of that season. He served as the Modesto Nuts pitching coach for the 2017 and 2018 seasons. He was the Arkansas Travelers pitching coach in 2019.  He was named the 2019 Texas League Coach of the Year.

On November 7, 2019, Woodworth was named the pitching coach for the Seattle Mariners.

References

External links

Florida Gulf Coast Eagles bio

1988 births
Living people
Baseball coaches from Florida
Baseball players from St. Petersburg, Florida
Baseball pitchers
Major League Baseball pitching coaches
Seattle Mariners coaches
Florida Gulf Coast Eagles baseball players
Florida Gulf Coast University alumni
Gulf Coast Rays players
Tampa Bay Rays scouts
Nova Southeastern Sharks baseball coaches
Florida Gulf Coast Eagles baseball coaches
Minor league baseball coaches